Pseudolabrus is a genus of wrasses native to the eastern Indian Ocean and the Pacific Ocean.

Species
The 12 currently recognized species in this genus are:
 Pseudolabrus biserialis (Klunzinger, 1880) (redband wrasse)
 Pseudolabrus eoethinus (J. Richardson, 1846) (red-naped wrasse)
 Pseudolabrus fuentesi (Regan, 1913) (Fuentesi's wrasse)
 Pseudolabrus gayi (Valenciennes, 1839)
 Pseudolabrus guentheri Bleeker, 1862 (Günther's wrasse)
 Pseudolabrus japonicus (Houttuyn, 1782)
 Pseudolabrus luculentus (J. Richardson, 1848) (orange wrasse)
 Pseudolabrus miles (J. G. Schneider & J. R. Forster, 1801) (scarlet wrasse)
 Pseudolabrus rubicundus (W. J. Macleay, 1881) (rosy wrasse)
 Pseudolabrus semifasciatus (Rendahl (de), 1921) (half-barred wrasse)
 Pseudolabrus sieboldi Mabuchi & Nakabo, 1997
 Pseudolabrus torotai B. C. Russell & J. E. Randall, 1981

References

 
Labridae
Marine fish genera
Taxa named by Pieter Bleeker